Megan Hull (born 12 May 1996) is a field hockey player from New Zealand, who plays as a defender.

Personal life
Megan Hull was born and raised in Pongaroa, New Zealand.

Career

National teams

Under-21
Throughout her junior career, Megan Hull was a member of the New Zealand U-21 team on three occasions. She represented the team during a test series in Breda; at the 2016 Junior Oceania Cup on the Gold Coast; and at the 2016 FIH Junior World Cup in Santiago.

Black Sticks
Hull made her debut for the Black Sticks in 2016 during a test series against Malaysia in Auckland.

During 2019, Hull represented the New Zealand team during the inaugural tournament of the FIH Pro League. Following the Pro League, Hull appeared at the Oceania Cup in Rockhampton, where the Black Sticks won gold and gained qualification to the 2020 Summer Olympics.

International goals

References

External links
 
 
 
 
 

1996 births
Living people
Female field hockey defenders
Field hockey players at the 2020 Summer Olympics
Olympic field hockey players of New Zealand
Field hockey players at the 2022 Commonwealth Games
21st-century New Zealand women
20th-century New Zealand women